Meera - Oru Puthu Kavithai ( Meera -A new Poem) is a 2022 Indian-Tamil language family drama television series, starring Kushboo Sundar and Suresh. The show is produced by Avni Telemedia and written by veteran actress Kushboo Sundar. It premiered on Colors Tamil on 28 March 2022, and ended on 22 July 2022 which aired from Monday to Friday at 21:30 and available for streaming in selected markets on Voot. The show is loosely based on Hindi soap opera Itna Karo Na Mujhe Pyaar.

Plot
The show deal with the relationship challenges of a divorced couple Meera and Krishna and how they remain connected because of their children. 

Meera (Kushboo Sundar) is a divorcée and lives with her one daughter Adhira and her mother Janaki. She is a strong and independent woman who works in a hospital as administrative head under the hospital owner Dr. Kannan. 
Dr. Krishna (Suresh Chandra Menon/Suresh), who is Meera's ex-husband, lives in Bangalore with his one son Ajay and foster Daughter Adhithi. Neil and Ragini decide to live together again but due to circumstances they get a meany problems.

Cast

Main
 Kushboo Sundar as Dr. Meera Krishna: Dr. Krishna's wife; Adhira and Ajay's mother. Janaki's daughter. She is a self independent gynecologist who works under Dr. Kannan in his hospital.
 Suresh Chandra Menon / Suresh as Dr. Krishna: Dr. Meera's husband; Adhira and Ajay's father. Adhithi's foster father. A very famous and expertised thoracic surgeon.

Supporting
 Pooja Lokesh as Anjali: Adithi’s aunt
 Isvar Raghunathan as Balaji: Jyothi’s husband
 Arvind Kathare as Chezhiyan
 Akshaya Kandamuthan as Adhira: Meera and Krishna’s daughter; Ajay’s sister
 Shanthi Williams as Janaki: Meera’s mother
 Anusai Elakeya as Dr. Arundathi
 Sai Krishna as Ajay: Meera and Krishna’s son; Adhira’s brother
 Shalini as Jyothi: Krishna's sister 
 Richie as Charan: Adhira's collegemate
 Rohit Ved as Dr. Kannan: Meera's best friend 
 Sumithra Sharma as Adithi: Anjali’s niece
 Revathy Sankar as Lakshmi: Kannan’s mother

Production

Development
On January end 2022, Colors Tamil confirmed through a press release that it would distribute new Tamil serial, to be produced by Kushboo Sundar under Avni Telemedia and also debuts as a screenplay writer by Kushboo Sundar.

Casting
Actress Kushboo Sundar was cast in the female lead role as Meera. The actor had made an official announcement through her social media handle about ‘Meera’ on 14 February. Actor Suresh Chandra Menon who plays the male lead alongside her but was replaced by Actor Suresh in June 2022. Pooja Lokesh, was cast as Negative role, who making her come back after 7 years.

Release
The first promo was unveiled on 5 February 2022, featuring protagonist khusboo face and hand-print, The second promo was unveiled on 9 February 2022, featuring protagonist Kushboo Sundar and Suresh Chandra Menon and revealing the release date.

References

External links

Colors Tamil original programming
Tamil-language melodrama television series
Tamil-language medical television series
2022 Tamil-language television series debuts
Tamil-language television shows
Television shows set in Tamil Nadu
Television shows set in Karnataka
2022 Tamil-language television series endings
Tamil-language television series based on Hindi-language television series